Black magic, also known as dark magic, has traditionally referred to the use of supernatural powers or magic for evil and selfish purposes, specifically the seven magical arts prohibited by canon law, as expounded by Johannes Hartlieb in 1456. 

In 1597, King James VI and I published a treatise, Daemonologie, a philosophical dissertation describing contemporary necromancy and the historical relationships between the various methods of divination used in black magic. This book is believed to be one of the main sources used by William Shakespeare in the production of Macbeth.

During his period of scholarship, A. E. Waite provided a comprehensive account of black magic practices, rituals and traditions in The Book of Ceremonial Magic (1911).

The seven Artes prohibitae of black magic

The seven artes prohibitae or artes magicae, arts prohibited by canon law, as expounded by Johannes Hartlieb in 1456, their sevenfold partition reflecting that of the artes liberales and artes mechanicae, were:

necromancy
geomancy
hydromancy
aeromancy
pyromancy
chiromancy
scapulimancy

The division between the four "elemental" disciplines (viz., geomancy, hydromancy, aeromancy,  pyromancy) is somewhat contrived. Chiromancy is the divination from a subject's palms as practiced by the Romani (at the time recently arrived in Europe), and scapulimancy is the divination from animal bones, in particular shoulder blades, as practiced in peasant superstition. Nigromancy contrasts with this as scholarly "high magic" derived from High Medieval grimoires such as the Picatrix or the Liber Rasielis.

Necromancy
Practitioners of necromancy or demonic magic in the late Middle Ages usually belonged to the educated elite, as the contents of most grimoires were written in Latin. Demonic magic was usually performed in groups surrounding a spiritual leader in possession of necromantic books. One such case in 1444, Inquisitor Gaspare Sighicelli took action against a group active in Bologna. Marco Mattei of Gesso and friar Jacopo of Viterbo confessed to taking part in magical practices.

Geomancy
The art of geomancy was one of the more popular forms of magic that people practiced during the Renaissance period. Geomancy was a form of divination where a person would cast sand, stone, or dirt on the ground and read the shapes. The Geomantic figures would then tell them "anything" based on geomancy charts that were used to read from the shape.

Hydromancy
Hydromancy, a form of divination using water, is typically used with scrying. Water is used as a medium for scrying to allow the practitioner to see illusionary pictures within it. Hydromancy originated from Babylonia and was popular during Byzantine times whereas in medieval Europe, it was associated with witchcraft.

Aeromancy
Aeromancy divination consisted in tossing sand, dirt, or seeds into the air and studying and interpreting the patterns of the dust cloud or the settling of the seeds. This also includes divination coming from thunder, comets, falling stars, and the shape of clouds.

Pyromancy
Pyromancy is the art of divination which consisted of signs and patterns from flames. There are many variations of pyromancy depending on the material thrown into a fire and it is thought to be used for sacrifices to the gods and that the deity is present within the flames with priests interpreting the omens conveyed.

Chiromancy
Chiromancy is a form of divination based on reading palms and based on intuitions and symbolism with some symbols tying into astrology. A line from a person's hand that resembles a square is considered a bad omen whereas a triangle would be a good omen. This idea comes from the trine and square aspect in the astrological aspects.

Scapulimancy
Scapulimancy was a form of divination using an animal's scapula. The scapula would be broken and based on how it was broken, it could be used to read the future. It was generally broken by heating it with hot coals until it broke.

History 

Like its counterpart white magic, the origins of black magic can be traced to the primitive, ritualistic worship of spirits as outlined in Robert M. Place's 2009 book, Magic and Alchemy. Unlike white magic, in which Place sees parallels with primitive shamanistic efforts to achieve closeness with spiritual beings, the rituals that developed into modern black magic were designed to invoke those same spirits to produce beneficial outcomes for the practitioner. Place also provides a broad modern definition of both black and white magic, preferring instead to refer to them as "high magic" (white) and "low magic" (black) based primarily on intentions of the practitioner employing them. He acknowledges, though, that this broader definition (of "high" and "low") suffers from prejudices because good-intentioned folk magic may be considered "low" while ceremonial magic involving expensive or exclusive components may be considered by some as "high magic", regardless of intent.

During the Renaissance, many magical practices and rituals were considered evil or irreligious and by extension, black magic in the broad sense. Witchcraft and non-mainstream esoteric study were prohibited and targeted by the Inquisition. As a result, natural magic developed as a way for thinkers and intellectuals, like Marsilio Ficino, abbot Johannes Trithemius and Heinrich Cornelius Agrippa, to advance esoteric and ritualistic study (though still often in secret) without significant persecution.

While "natural magic" became popular among the educated and upper classes of the 16th and 17th century, ritualistic magic and folk magic remained subject to persecution. Twentieth-century writer Montague Summers generally rejects the definitions of "white" and "black" magic as "contradictory", though he highlights the extent to which magic in general, regardless of intent, was considered "black" and cites William Perkins posthumous 1608 instructions in that regard:

In particular, though, the term was most commonly reserved for those accused of invoking demons and other evil spirits, those hexing or cursing their neighbours, those using magic to destroy crops, and those capable of leaving their earthly bodies and travelling great distances in spirit (to which the Malleus Maleficarum "devotes one long and important chapter"), usually to engage in devil-worship.

In a modern context, the line between white magic and black magic is somewhat clearer and most modern definitions focus on intent rather than practice. There is also an extent to which many modern Wicca and witchcraft practitioners have sought to distance themselves from those intent on practising black magic. Those who seek to do harm or evil are less likely to be accepted into mainstream Wiccan circles or covens in an era where benevolent magic is increasingly associated with new-age beliefs and practices, and self-help spiritualism.

In Western religions

The links and interaction between black magic and religion are many and varied. Beyond black magic's historical persecution by Christianity and its inquisitions, there are links between religious and black magic rituals. For example, 17th-century priest Étienne Guibourg is said to have performed a series of Black Mass rituals with alleged witch Catherine Monvoisin for Madame de Montespan.

The influence of popular culture has allowed other practices to be drawn in under the broad banner of black magic, including the concept of Satanism.  While the invocation of demons or spirits is an accepted part of black magic, this practice is distinct from the worship or deification of such spiritual beings. The two are usually combined in medieval beliefs about witchcraft.

Those lines, though, continue to be blurred by the inclusion of spirit rituals from otherwise white magicians in compilations of work related to Satanism. John Dee's sixteenth century rituals, for example, were included in Anton LaVey's The Satanic Bible (1969) and so some of his practises, otherwise considered white magic, have since been associated with black magic.  Dee's rituals themselves were designed to contact spirits in general and angels in particular, which he claimed to have been able to do with the assistance of colleague Edward Kelley.  LaVey's Bible, however, is a "complete contradiction" of Dee's intentions but offers the same rituals as a means of contact with evil spirits and demons. LaVey's Church of Satan "officially denies the efficacy of occult ritual" but "affirms the subjective, psychological value of ritual practice", drawing a clear distinction between.

Voodoo

Voodoo has been associated with modern black magic; drawn together in popular culture and fiction.  However, while hexing or cursing may be accepted black magic practices, Voodoo has its own distinct history and traditions.

Voodoo tradition makes its own distinction between black and white magic, with sorcerers like the Bokor known for using magic and rituals of both.  But their penchant for magic associated with curses, poisons and zombies means they, and Voodoo in general, are regularly associated with black magic in particular.

In popular culture 
Concepts related to black magic or described as black magic are a regular feature of books, films and other popular culture. Examples include:

 The Devil Rides Out (1934) – a novel by Dennis Wheatley – made into a famous film by Hammer Studios in 1968.
 Rosemary's Baby (1968) – a horror novel in which black magic is a central theme.
 The Craft (1996) – a horror film featuring four friends who become involved in white witchcraft but turn to black magic rituals for personal gain.
 Harry Potter book series (1997–2007) – black magic spells and curses are referred to as "the dark arts" against which students are taught to defend themselves. Made into a film series (2001–2011).
 Sherlock Holmes (2009) – the first of the three Sherlock Holmes films directed by Guy Ritchie includes elements of black magic although they are later discovered to be false.
 In the 2022 Russian invasion of Ukraine, Russian state media claimed that Ukraine was using black magic to fend off the Russian military, specifically accusing Oleksiy Arestovych of enlisting sorcerers and witches as well as Ukrainian soldiers of consecrating "weapons with blood magick".

See also 

 Dakini – female demon or witch in Hinduism
 
 
 
 
 
 
 
 Sexuality in Christian demonology (incubus and succubus)

References

Notes

Citations

Works cited

 
 
 
 
 
 
 
 
 
 
 
 
 
 
 
 
 
 
 
 
 
 

Left-Hand Path